Leucopsacidae is a family of glass sponges belonging to the order Lyssacinosa.

References

External links 
 
 

Hexactinellida
Sponge families